A hori-hori, sometimes referred to as a "soil knife" or a "weeding knife", is a heavy serrated multi-purpose steel blade for gardening jobs such as digging or cutting. The blade is sharp on both sides and comes to a semi-sharp point at the end.

The word hori (ホリ) means "to dig" in Japanese and "hori-hori" is the onomatopoeia for a digging sound.

History 
The hori-hori digging tool, first implemented in Japan, was originally used for carefully excavating plants such as Sansai in the mountains.

Description and uses
The size of the knife varies from eleven to fifteen inches in total length, depending on the size of the handle. The size of the blade can vary, but it is normally around 6” × 1”.

The stainless steel blade is often polished to a mirror-like finish and is usually paired with a scabbard. 

The blade is razor sharp and is serrated for cutting through roots and tough soil. Functions include a knife, a saw, a digging tool, or as a measuring device for planting bulbs.

The hori-hori has uses in gardening such as weeding, cutting roots, transplanting, removing plants, sod cutting, and splitting perennials. The blade is made of carbon or stainless steel that is concave shaped to make it ideal for digging and prying. The blade has a large smooth wooden handle for comfortable use with one hand. It can serve as a small hand axe.

See also
 Kaiken (dagger)
 Kunai
 Tantō
 Trowel

References

 

Gardening tools
Japanese knives